Ellenthorpe is a civil parish in the Borough of Harrogate of North Yorkshire, England. In 2001, the civil parish had 34 inhabitants. It was mentioned in the Domesday Book (1086) as Adelingestorp.

References

Civil parishes in North Yorkshire
Borough of Harrogate